Simon Hofer (born 22 July 1981) is a Swiss footballer who plays for FC Baar. He formerly played for SC Cham for and FC Lucerne in the Swiss Super League.

References 

1981 births
Living people
Swiss men's footballers
FC Luzern players
SC Cham players
Association football midfielders